Sara Barron (born ) is an American comedian and writer based in the United Kingdom.

Early life 

Barron was born in Chicago.

Career 

Before moving to London, Barron lived in New York. In 2009, her memoir People Are Unappealing received some media attention for a chapter detailing her encounters with obnoxious celebrities while working as a waitress. She was one of the hosts of the storytelling show The Moth.

In 2018, Barron's debut show at the Edinburgh Festival Fringe, For Worse, was nominated for the Edinburgh Comedy Awards Best Newcomer Award. She returned to the Fringe in 2019 with Enemies Closer, and in 2022 with Hard Feelings.

Her television appearances have included Would I Lie to You?, Richard Osman's House of Games, Frankie Boyle's New World Order and Roast Battle.

She co-hosts Firecrotch & Normcore, a podcast about the TV series Succession, with her husband Geoff Lloyd.

Bibliography

References

External links
 

Living people
American expatriates in England
American emigrants to England
Year of birth missing (living people)